Our Lady and St Margaret's Primary School is a former Catholic primary school located at Stanley Street, Kinning Park, Glasgow, Scotland. In earlier years it was a junior secondary school. The annex of this school was located in the nearby Admiral Street Infants School. The school, designed by the architects Bruce & Hay, was established in 1910. Bruce & Hay were known for their work designing warehouses and offices and critics have compared the school's appearance to that of a warehouse. It was closed in 1996–97.

This is a Category C(s) listed building as a good example of a school building on a palazzo scale. In addition to the school, there was a presbytery in the building that was opened in 1882. Of particular interest are the upper-storey playgrounds. The school building is still intact at present.

References

Further reading
 Ordnance Survey map, 1896 (earlier structure evident on school site, presbytery evident)
 Ordnance Survey map, 1913 (both evident)
 Dean of Guild Plans (Mitchell Library, Glasgow) dated February 1908
 Elizabeth Williamson, Anne Riches, Malcolm Higgs THE BUILDINGS OF SCOTLAND: GLASGOW (1990), pp590, 593, 600.

Defunct schools in Glasgow
Educational institutions established in 1910
Educational institutions disestablished in 1997
Category C listed buildings in Glasgow
Defunct Catholic primary schools in Scotland
Listed schools in Scotland
1910 establishments in Scotland
1997 disestablishments in Scotland
Govan